Danyingon railway station (lit. "Dogfruit Hill") is a railway station on the Yangon Circular Railway in Yangon, Burma. The station has one island platform and one side platform.
Track 1 and 2 serve Yangon Circular Railway and tracks 3 and 4 serve the Hlawga railway station branch line and Pyay and Bagan line.

References

Railway stations in Yangon